Ustynivka is an urban-type settlement in Kropyvnytskyi Raion of Kirovohrad Oblast in Ukraine. It is located on the Berezivka, a left tributary of the Inhul in the drainage basin of the Southern Bug. Ustynivka hosts the administration of Ustynivka settlement hromada, one of the hromadas of Ukraine. Population: 

Until 18 July 2020, Ustynivka was the administrative center of Ustynivka Raion. The raion was abolished in July 2020 as part of the administrative reform of Ukraine, which reduced the number of raions of Kirovohrad Oblast to four. The area of Ustynivka Raion was merged into Kropyvnytskyi Raion.

Economy

Transportation
The settlement has access to  Highway H11 connecting Kryvyi Rih and Odessa, as well as to Highway H14 connecting Kropyvnytskyi and Mykolaiv.

References

Urban-type settlements in Kropyvnytskyi Raion